Manduca gloriosa is a moth of the family Sphingidae. It is known from Peru.

References

Manduca
Moths described in 2007